Marshall County is a county located in the U.S. state of Iowa. As of the 2020 census, the population was 40,105. The county seat is Marshalltown. The county was formed on January 13, 1846, and named after John Marshall, Chief Justice of the United States Supreme Court.

Marshall County comprises the Marshalltown, IA Micropolitan Statistical Area.

In 2010, the center of population of Iowa was located in Marshall County, near Melbourne.

Geography

Major highways

Adjacent counties
Jasper County (South)
Tama County (East)
Story County (West)
Hardin County (Northwest)
Grundy County (North)

Demographics

2020 census
There were 16,745 housing units, of which 15,358 were occupied.

2010 census
There were 16,831 housing units, of which 15,538 were occupied.

2000 census

At the 2000 census there were 39,311 people, 15,338 households, and 10,460 families in the county.  The population density was 69 people per square mile (27/km2).  There were 16,324 housing units at an average density of 28 per square mile (11/km2).  The racial makeup of the county was 90.44% White, 0.93% Black or African American, 0.35% Native American, 0.78% Asian, 0.06% Pacific Islander, 6.03% from other races, and 1.42% from two or more races.  8.96%. were Hispanic or Latino of any race.

Of the 15,338 households 31.10% had children under the age of 18 living with them, 55.40% were married couples living together, 9.30% had a female householder with no husband present, and 31.80% were non-families. 26.90% of households were one person and 12.20% were one person aged 65 or older.  The average household size was 2.48 and the average family size was 3.00.

The age distribution was 25.30% under the age of 18, 8.10% from 18 to 24, 26.30% from 25 to 44, 23.90% from 45 to 64, and 16.40% 65 or older.  The median age was 39 years. For every 100 females there were 99.20 males.  For every 100 females age 18 and over, there were 96.50 males.

The median household income was $38,268 and the median family income  was $46,627. Males had a median income of $33,809 versus $24,063 for females. The per capita income for the county was $19,176.  About 7.10% of families and 10.20% of the population were below the poverty line, including 14.30% of those under age 18 and 8.60% of those age 65 or over.

Communities

Cities

Albion
Clemons
Ferguson
Gilman
Haverhill
Laurel
Le Grand
Liscomb
Marshalltown
Melbourne
Rhodes (previously named Edenville)
St. Anthony
State Center

Census-designated place
Green Mountain

Other unincorporated communities
Bangor
Dunbar
LaMoille
Marietta
Quarry

Townships

Bangor
Eden
Greencastle
Iowa
Jefferson
Le Grand
Liberty
Liscomb
Logan
Marietta
Marion
Marshall
Minerva
State Center
Taylor
Timber Creek
Vienna
Washington

Population ranking
The population ranking of the following table is based on the 2020 census of Marshall County.

† county seat

Politics
Prior to 1964, Marshall County was strongly Republican, never backing a Democratic presidential candidate from 1880 to 1960 and only failing to back a Republican candidate during those years in 1912 with a strong third party campaign by former president Theodore Roosevelt on the Bull Moose ticket. Since then, it has become far more of a swing county, having backed the national winner in the seven presidential elections from 1992 to 2016. That streak was broken in 2020, when Donald Trump won the county but lost nationally. The county is considered a bellwether polity.

See also

Marshall County Courthouse
National Register of Historic Places listings in Marshall County, Iowa

References

External links

Marshall County government's website

 
1846 establishments in Iowa Territory
Populated places established in 1846